Bryant Lionel Giles (20 May 1928 – 12 August 2018) was an Australian politician who represented the South Australian House of Assembly seat of Gumeracha from 1968 to 1970 for the Liberal and Country League.

References

 

1928 births
2018 deaths
Members of the South Australian House of Assembly
Liberal and Country League politicians